Peter Greene (born Peter Green; October 8, 1965) is an American actor. A character actor, he is generally known for portraying villains. He is best known for the roles in the 1994 films The Mask, where he plays the film's antagonist, Dorian Tyrell, and Pulp Fiction, in which he portrayed Zed, a sadistic security guard, rapist, and serial killer who serves as an antagonist in the film.

Early life
A native of Montclair, New Jersey, Greene did not pursue a career in acting until his mid-20s. He initially landed several roles in cinema and television in the early 1990s.

Film career
Greene had roles in Pulp Fiction; The Mask; Clean, Shaven; and The Usual Suspects in 1994 and 1995. In Pulp Fiction, Greene appeared as Zed, who rapes Marsellus Wallace. The Mask saw him play the villainous Dorian Tyrell opposite Jim Carrey and Cameron Diaz. Greene played the schizophrenic Peter Winter in Clean, Shaven. The Usual Suspects saw him play the character of Redfoot. Greene often plays villains, such as in Judgment Night, Under Siege 2: Dark Territory, Training Day (as a corrupt narcotics officer) and martial arts/crime film Fist of the Warrior (opposite Ho-Sung Pak, Roger Guenveur Smith and Sherilyn Fenn).

Greene worked with director Jordan Alan twice: once on the film Kiss and Tell, a dark comic turn and then again four years later in The Gentleman Bandit (aka Gentleman B).  After Greene's arrests in 1998 for drug related crimes, Alan had to put the actor through rehab to get him through the second film and eventually, after coming upon Greene doing heroin with Mike Starr, he was forced to replace Greene's voice because of the vocal problems caused by drugs. Despite these problems, Alan vouched for Greene to producer Tobe Jaffe for the movie Blue Streak, in which Greene played Martin Lawrence's nemesis.

Greene has continued to work mostly as a character actor. He appeared in the short-lived television drama The Black Donnellys. He also appeared as a policeman in Prodigy and Mobb Deep's video for "A,B,C's", as well as the focal character in House of Pain's video for "Fed Up". Greene appeared in the opening scene of the premiere of the FX series Justified where he was characterized as a "thuggish Peter Weller lookalike" by reviewer Scott Tobias, writing for The A.V. Club. He has appeared in two films by director Eric Brian Hughes: Turnabout and Exit 0. Greene appears in the digital series The Jersey Connection by filmmaker Tim Firtion. Greene was featured in the 2020 TV series For Life in a small role as an Aryan Brother named "Wild Bill" Miller.

Personal life
Greene struggled with heroin and cocaine addiction in the 1990s. In 2007, Greene was arrested for possessing crack cocaine.

Filmography

Laws of Gravity (1992) as Jimmy
Clean, Shaven (1993) as Peter Winter
Judgment Night (1993) as Sykes
Pulp Fiction (1994) as Zed
The Mask (1994) as Dorian Tyrell
The Usual Suspects (1995) as Redfoot, The Fence (uncredited)
Under Siege 2: Dark Territory (1995) as Mercenary #1
Bang (1995) as Adam
Lowball (1996) as John
Coyote Run (1996) as Clifton Santier / Bosco
The Rich Man's Wife (1996) as Cole Wilson
Snakeland (1996, Short) as Johnny
Do Me a Favor (1997) as Teddy
Double Tap (1997) as Nash
Kiss & Tell (1997) as Detective John Finnigan
Black Cat Run (1998) as D.J. Wheeler
Permanent Midnight (1998) as Gus
Out in Fifty (1999) as Tony Grayson
Blue Streak (1999) as Deacon
The Boss (1999)
Shadow Hours (2000) as Detective Steve Andrianson
Nobody's Baby (2001) as Vern
Ticker (2001) as Detective Artie Pluchinsky
Training Day (2001) as Detective Jeff (uncredited)
Scenes of the Crime (2001) as Rick
Dead Dogs Lie (2001) as Marcus Devlin
Under the Influence (2002) as Stephen Tally
Gentleman B. (2002) as Manny Breen
Black Cloud (2004) as Norm Olsen
From the Day In (2005) as Chat
Confession (2005) as Detective William Fletcher
H. G. Wells' War of the Worlds (2005) as Matt Herbert
Brothers in Arms (2005) a Bert
End Game (2006) as Jack Baldwin
The Black Donnellys (2007, TV Series) as Dokey Farrell
Love Hollywood Style (2006) as Theodor Caruso
Fist of the Warrior (2007) as John Lowe
I'm Calling Frank (2007) as Bobby
Final Engagement (2007) as Priest
Bloom (2007, Short) as Jim
Clown (2008, Short) as Clown
Blue Knight (2009, Short) as Sergeant Donato
Life on Mars (2009, U.S. TV series) as Jimmy McManus
Forget Me Not (2009, Short) as Boyfriend
Dead Metropolis (2009) as Dr. Frost
Caller ID (2010) as Admissions Counselor
Earthling (2010) as Swinnert
Justified (2010, TV series) as Thomas Buckley
The Bounty Hunter (2010) as Earl Mahler
Once Fallen (2010) as 'Sonny' Coogan
Once More (2010, Short) as Jack
Keep Your Enemies Closer (2011, TV series) as Alex Decker
The Grasslands (2011) as Baby John
Shanghai Hotel (2011) as Mr. Capuzzi
Hawaii Five-0 (2012, TV series) as Rick Peterson
Brutal (2012) as Carlo Morello
 (2012) as Detective Engler
Sweet Lorraine (2015) as Marcus
New York New York (2016)
Turnabout (2016) as Leo
Caller ID: Entity (2017)
Sets (2018) as Himself
Exit 0 (2018) as The Writer
City of Lies (2018) as Commander Fasulo
The Jersey Connection (2018, TV series) as Jordan Blaine
Samir (2019) as Valentine
Let’s Get Lost (2020) as Ray
Tesla (2020) as Nichols
 For Life (TV Series 2020) as Wild Bill 'Wild Bill' Miller
Body Brokers (2021) as Dr. Riner
Dead Body Found... (2022) as Sergeant Crosby
R.A. the Rugged Man: Dragon Fire (2022) as the Big Boss

References

External links

1965 births
Living people
20th-century American male actors
21st-century American male actors
American male film actors
American male television actors
American people of Irish descent
Male actors from New Jersey
People from Montclair, New Jersey